The chapters of Nana are written and illustrated by Ai Yazawa. Nana premiered in the Japanese manga magazine Cookie in 2000 where it ran until June 2009, when the series was put on hiatus because of Yazawa's illness. Yazawa returned from hospital in early April 2010, though had not specified when or if she will resume the manga.  Yazawa published a two-page chapter of "Junko's Room", a side story about a friend of one of the two main characters, in the March 2013 issue of Cookie. This is the first manga she has published since her 2009 illness.  The chapters have been collected and published in 21 tankōbon volumes in Japan by Shueisha.

Nana is licensed for English-language release in North America by Viz Media. It was serialized in Viz's manga anthology Shojo Beat, from July 2005 to August 2007. The series continued publication in book form, with all 21 volumes released as of July 6, 2010. Madman Entertainment distributes the series in New Zealand and Australia. It is also licensed in Germany by Egmont Manga & Anime, in Italy and Mexico by Panini Comics, in France by Éditions Delcourt, in Taiwan by Sharp Point Press, in South Korea by Haksan Publishing, in Spain by Planeta DeAgostini, in Brazil by Editora JBC, in Argentina by Editorial Ivrea, and in Thailand by Bongkoch Publishing.



Volume list

Notes

References

External links
 Nana at Shueisha's website 
Nana at Viz Media's website

Nana